Joel M. Stern was chairman and chief executive officer of Stern Value Management, formerly Stern Stewart & Co, and the creator and developer of economic value added. He was a recognised authority on financial economics, corporate performance measurement, corporate valuation and incentive compensation and was a pioneer and leading advocate of the concept of shareholder value. He was also active in academia, and in the media.

Career 
After graduating from the University of Chicago's graduate program in Finance and Economics (MBA, Chicago-Booth, 1964), he joined the Chase Manhattan Bank where he ultimately ran Chase Financial Policy, their global consulting operation. During this time, he developed EVA. In 1982, after 18 years at Chase Manhattan, he started Stern Stewart.

He is the author of two books and the co-author of six others – all in financial economics. He served as the executive editor of the Journal of Applied Corporate Finance and was a member of the editorial board of the Journal of Financial Management and Analysis.

He taught at or has served on the adjunct faculties of several graduate business schools in America and abroad, including University of Maryland's Robert H. Smith School of Business, Carnegie Mellon University's Tepper School of Business, The University of Chicago (Chicago-Booth), the University of Cape Town, Singapore Management University, Universidad Francisco Marroquín, Universidad EAFIT, and the Lauder Business School.  He is also part of the Executive Advisory Committee of the William E. Simon Graduate School of Business Administration at the University of Rochester and was a member of the University of Chicago's Council on the Graduate School of Business.

His media involvements include being the financial policy columnist for the London Sunday Times and The Financial Times. He has also written for the Wall Street Journal editorial page, the New York Times and Fortune amongst others. He also has appeared on national business news programs, including Bloomberg TV’s Taking Stock with Pimm Fox, CNBC Asia’s Squawk Box, CNN’s Moneyline and Wall Street Week, where he was a rotating panelist for 17 years.

He died on May 21, 2019.

References

External links
Joel Stern – Stern Value Management Executive Profile
Joel Stern - Articles
 University of Chicago Graduate School of Business: The Origins of EVA
 Joel Stern interviewed at UFM, Guatemala
 Joel Stern's company website, Stern Value Management
 Joel Stern's interactive online learning platform
 Economic Value Added (EVA), interview with Joel Stern

Corporate finance theorists
University of Chicago Booth School of Business alumni
American chief executives of financial services companies
Year of birth missing
2019 deaths